Graham Norman Stanton (1940–2009) was a New Zealand biblical scholar who taught at King's College, London, and as Lady Margaret's Professor of Divinity at the University of Cambridge. A New Testament specialist, Stanton's special interests were in the Gospels, with a particular focus on Matthew's Gospel; Paul's letters, with a particular focus on Galatians; and second-century Christian writings, with a particular interest in Justin Martyr.

Biography
Stanton was born on 9 July 1940 in Christchurch, New Zealand. He came to Cambridge in 1966 to study under C. F. D. Moule (at Westminster College and as a member of Fitzwilliam College), his dissertation was completed in 1969 and published in 1974. From 1970 to 1998, he served as lecturer and (from 1977) as Professor of New Testament at King's College, London. In 1998, he returned to Cambridge as Lady Margaret's Professor and as a Fellow at Fitzwilliam College.

In 1996–1997, Stanton was the President of the Studiorum Novi Testamenti Societas, a society of New Testament scholars. In 1982–1990), he was editor of the journal New Testament Studies and of the associated monograph series (1982–1991) and was a General Editor of the International Critical Commentaries (1984-2009).

Among other honours, Stanton was awarded an honorary Doctor of Divinity degree from the University of Otago in 2000; in 2005, he was honoured with a Festschrift to mark his 65th birthday. The Written Gospel (eds. M. Bockmuehl and D. Hagner, Cambridge University Press) includes a bibliography of Stanton's books and articles until 2005 (9 authored books, 6 edited books, 60 authored articles or chapters). In 2006 he was awarded the Burkitt Medal by the British Academy for his contribution to biblical studies in the United Kingdom.

Stanton died on 18 July 2009 in Cambridge. In 2011, a collection of essays discussing various aspects of Stanton's work was published in his memory.

Criticism of Christ myth theory

Stanton criticised the arguments of Christ myth theorists. In his book The Gospels and Jesus, he wrote:

Today, nearly all historians, whether Christians or not, accept that Jesus existed and that the gospels contain plenty of valuable evidence which has to be weighed and assessed critically. There is general agreement that, with the possible exception of Paul, we know far more about Jesus of Nazareth than about any first or second century Jewish or pagan religious teacher.

Works

Books

Edited works

Articles and chapters

Festscrift

References

External links
 Professor Graham Stanton - Daily Telegraph obituary
  - J.D.G. Dunn on "Graham Stanton (1940-2009)"
 
 

1940 births
2009 deaths
Academic journal editors
Academics of King's College London
Critics of the Christ myth theory
Fellows of Fitzwilliam College, Cambridge
New Testament scholars
New Zealand biblical scholars
New Zealand Presbyterians
New Zealand theologians
Religious leaders from Christchurch
University of Otago alumni
Lady Margaret's Professors of Divinity
Oceanian biblical scholars